In some versions of Norse mythology, Váli was one of the sons of Loki. He is mentioned in the Gylfaginning section of Snorri Sturluson's Prose Edda, chapter 50. After the death of Baldr, the Æsir chase down and capture Loki; in this version it is an unnamed god rather than Váli, son of Loki, who binds Loki with his son's entrails:

Váli, son of Loki, is otherwise unknown. A variant version in the Hauksbók manuscript of stanza 34 of "Völuspá" refers to this event; it begins: "Þá kná Vála | vígbǫnd snúa", usually amended to the nominative Váli in order to provide a subject for the verb; in Ursula Dronke's translation in her edition of the poem, "Then did Váli | slaughter bonds twist". This presumably refers to Váli, son of Óðinn, who was begotten to avenge Baldr's death, and thus it is not unlikely that he bound Loki; but the Hauksbók stanza interrupts the flow of "Völuspá" at this point and presumably draws on a variant oral tradition. It is likely that this was Snorri's source, and that he interpreted the manuscript text Vála vígbǫnd as "bonds from Váli's act of slaughter", thus inventing a second Váli. In the rather cryptic prose at the end of "Lokasenna", which appears to be derived from Snorri's account, Narfi transforms into a wolf and his brother Nari's guts are used to bind their father.

References

Jötnar
Loki